The Foshan Aquatics Center is a sports venue in Central Park, Xincheng District, Foshan City.

It hosted synchronized swimming events during the 2010 Asian Games.

References

Sports venues in China
Venues of the 2010 Asian Games